Mister Maker Around the World is a spin-off of the children's television Mister Maker commissioned by Michael Carrington at the BBC for CBeebies. 2 spin-offs followed, Mister Maker's Arty Party, and Mister Maker at Home, which began airing in 2015 and 2020 respectively. The show started airing in 2013.

Episodes 
Episode 1 
Episode 2
Episode 3
Episode 4
Episode 5
Episode 6
Episode 7
Episode 8
Episode 9
Episode 10
Episode 11
Episode 12
Episode 13
Episode 14
Episode 15
Episode 16
Episode 17
Episode 18
Episode 19
Episode 20
Episode 21
Episode 22
Episode 23
Episode 24
Episode 25
Episode 26

External links
 

2013 British television series debuts
2014 British television series endings
2010s British children's television series
BBC children's television shows
2010s preschool education television series
British preschool education television series
British television spin-offs
British television shows featuring puppetry
Television series by Banijay
CBeebies